The 2019 FIBA U18 European Championship Division B was the 15th edition of the Division B of FIBA U18 European Championship. The competition takes place in Oradea, Romania, from 26 July to 4 August 2019.

Participating teams

  

  (16th place, 2018 FIBA U18 European Championship Division A)

  (3rd place, 2018 FIBA U18 European Championship Division C)

  (Winners, 2018 FIBA U18 European Championship Division C)

  (15th place, 2018 FIBA U18 European Championship Division A)

Group phase
In this round, the 24 teams are allocated in four groups of six teams each.

Group A

Group B

Group C

Group D

Final round

17th–24th place playoffs

9th–16th place playoffs

Championship playoffs

Final

Final standings

References

External links
FIBA official website

FIBA U18 European Championship Division B
2019–20 in European basketball
2019–20 in Romanian basketball
FIBA U18
International youth basketball competitions hosted by Romania
Sport in Oradea
July 2019 sports events in Europe
August 2019 sports events in Europe